Komarapuram is a village in Rajavommangi Mandal, Alluri Sitharama Raju district in the state of Andhra Pradesh in India.

Geography 

Demographics 
 India census, Komarapuram had a population of 352, out of which 169 were male and 183 were female. The population of children below 6 years of age was 13%. The literacy rate of the village was 38%.

References 

Villages in Rajavommangi mandal